Arapiles may refer to:

 Mount Arapiles, Victoria, Australia
 Arapiles, Salamanca, a village in Spain
 Arapiles (Madrid), a barrio
 , an ironclad of the Spanish Navy